Pseudopolycesta tigrina is a species of beetles in the family Buprestidae, the only species in the genus Pseudopolycesta.

References

Monotypic Buprestidae genera